The West Coastway line is a railway line in England linking the densely populated conurbations of Brighton/Hove/Littlehampton and Southampton/Portsmouth, with 1.3 million people between them. It has short southward branches to Littlehampton and Bognor Regis. Some trains using part of the route operate as direct continuations of passenger services to/from London, particularly those to the branch stations mentioned.

From Brighton the East Coastway line continues to Hastings via Lewes, Eastbourne and Bexhill, and then to Ashford International, Kent via the Marshlink line.

The section east of the city of Portsmouth was electrified by the Southern Railway before the Second World War. The electrification of the tracks further west in the late 1980s enabled electrified trains to travel the whole route via Netley to Southampton or via Botley to Eastleigh. The London and South Western Railway ran the tracks west of Farlington Junction which lies north of Portsmouth by the inland shore of Langstone Harbour. This section was served and timetabled separately before its electrification, a vestige of having had a different original railway company.

Definition and electrification
The West Coastway line runs almost alongside or within a few miles of the south coast of Sussex and Hampshire, between Brighton and Southampton.

East of Portsmouth the line was electrified (using 750 V DC third rail) by the Southern Railway before the Second World War in two stages:
Brighton to West Worthing in 1933,
West Worthing to Havant in 1938 (where it joined up with the electrified Portsmouth Direct line), including the Littlehampton and Bognor branches.

Services
Current service patterns
Southern is the main operator of passenger services and stations on the line east of Portsmouth.  Service patterns have varied over the years, but have always included a slow service (calling at most or all stations) from Brighton to Portsmouth.  Regular services run from London Victoria via Gatwick which avoid Brighton by using the tunnel between Preston Park and Hove.  These services run to Littlehampton (2016); similar services extended to Chichester, Portsmouth and Southampton particularly in the initial decades of open competition between operators, making use of statutory and negotiated running rights.  Other services run from London Victoria via Gatwick and the Arun Valley line to Bognor Regis or along more of the West Coastway line, between Ford and nearby Chichester, to Portsmouth or Southampton.  All of the Southern services are operated by electric multiple-units. Many of these trains join/"couple" or divide/"uncouple" during their journey, historically at Barnham Junction, today at Horsham.

The section west of Portsmouth sees trains from typically three operators. Its stations are managed by South Western Railway, who operate regular services from Portsmouth either to Southampton or to London Waterloo (less directly than its Portsmouth Direct Line, instead via Fareham, Botley, Hedge End and Eastleigh). Southern operate hourly services: between Brighton and Southampton Central; and between London Victoria and Southampton. The Southampton to London Victoria trains introduced at electrification created many direct routes, from Southampton, Swanwick, Fareham and Cosham to the West Sussex coast and particularly to Gatwick Airport.

Historic service patterns
Beyond the line and its main links to London, before late 2007 trains ran from Reading or Basingstoke to Portsmouth or Brighton; Basingstoke to Portsmouth being current. The Department for Transport withdrew the obligation of South West Trains to run Brighton services — being somewhat orbital around London — which left free train paths which were filled by extra Southern trains mainly bound to or from London.

Prior to the 1980s electrification of the "(south) Hampshire lines", including the part of this line west of Farlington, they were operated as a separate entity terminating at Portsmouth – few trains traversed the Cosham to Farlington triangle which lies north of Portsmouth and Langstone Harbours, except a daily Brighton-to-Exeter through (direct) train.  After dieselisation using 3H units in 1958, the general service pattern every hour was one semi-fast from Portsmouth to Southampton and Salisbury (some extended to Bristol), one stopping to Southampton Central and one train to Botley and Eastleigh (some extended to Reading and, until 1966, Romsey via Chandler's Ford).

Trains used on the service: 
-Class 377 (Electric Multiple Unit) - First manufactured: May 2003 - Present 
-Class 313 (Electric Multiple Unit) - First manufactured: 1976 - 1977

History

The lines now operated under the banner "West Coastway" have a complex history and were built in stages by five different companies between 1840 and 1889.

The line from Brighton to Shoreham was a branch of the London and Brighton Railway which opened 12 May 1840, before the completion of the main line.  The extensions of this line to Worthing (opened 24 November 1845), to Arundel & Littlehampton (opened 16 March 1846) and to Chichester (opened 8 June 1846) were built by the Brighton and Chichester Railway.  In July 1846 these two companies merged with others to form the London, Brighton and South Coast Railway (LBSCR), which continued the line to Havant (opened 15 March 1847) and Portsmouth (opened 14 June 1847).  Part of this section became jointly owned with the London and South Western Railway (LSWR), following the opening of the LSWR line from Fareham to Portcreek Junction on 1 October 1848 (connecting to the Eastleigh–Fareham line).

The Southampton and Netley Railway built a line to connect with the Victoria Military Hospital at Netley, which opened 5 March 1866 and was operated by the LSWR.  The final connecting link from Netley to Fareham was opened by the LSWR on 2 September 1889.

In the meanwhile the LBSCR opened the Littlehampton branch from Ford Junction on 17 August 1863 and the Bognor Regis branch from Barnham Junction on 1 June 1864.

Accidents and incidents
On 23 July 1894 the break van and two carriages of a train were derailed and overturned at Farlington Halt. The guard was killed and seven passengers injured.
Eight people were injured and three killed.

Developments, major engineering features and minor station closures
 Brighton trains serving the West Coastway leave from platforms 1, 2 and 3 on a curve to leave the Brighton Main Line.
 There was Holland Road Halt opened 1905 and closed 1956; when closed it was the only station on the West Coastway line to retain timber decking. This station was sited just west of the Holland Road bridge. Remains of the steps from the street and the concrete supports can occasionally be seen in winter beside the Up (Brighton) line.
Note: To the east of the Holland Road bridge lay the site of a first Hove station, 1840 to 1880, the site was later used as a commercial coal yard
 Aldrington replaced Dyke Junction Halt in 1932 on an adjacent site. Dyke Junction Halt opened in 1905 to serve the Devil's Dyke single-line branch ( in length) closed 1938
 there is the now closed branch to Kingston Wharf, serving Shoreham Harbour
 there was the junction for the line to Horsham, opened 16 September 1861 and closed 7 March 1966. The line followed the valley of the River Adur
 there was Bungalow Town Halt  opened 1910, later to serve Shoreham Airport, closed in 1940 for national security reasons (Shoreham Airport became an RAF base during WWII).
 Littlehampton branch
 This is a  branch line opened as a single line in 1863 and doubled in 1887
 Ford, was Ford Junction: at the third node of the triangle
 Barnham was Barnham Junction until 1929 opened 1864 as the junction for
 Bognor Regis branch
 This a  branch line
  Drayton station – closed
 Chichester Original terminus of the Brighton and Chichester Railway on 6 June 1846; present station opened 1847 when the line was extended to Havant. Junction for the West Sussex Railway opened in 1897, closed 1935; and for the LBSCR branch to Midhurst, opened 1881 and closed to passengers 1935.
 Havant: Junction for the L&SWR Portsmouth Direct line through Petersfield and also for the LBSCR Hayling Island branch line opened 16 July 1867,  in length with two intermediate stations serving Langstone and North Hayling. The line closed in 1963.
 A triangular junction — for the two routes to Southampton and Portsmouth Harbour. After Farlington Junction and Portcreek Junction (between which was the now closed Farlington Halt railway station) Portsmouth Direct line trains use the joint L&SWR/LBSCR metals to Portsmouth. The main West Coastway route travels across the triangle to Cosham Junction where the L&SWR section, opened on 2 September 1889, begins:
 Cosham
 Portchester
 Fareham First opened in 1841 as part of the Eastleigh–Fareham line. The lines to Portsmouth via Cosham and Southampton, via Netley, opened in 1848 and 1889 respectively (see dates above). There were also junctions for Gosport (the original connection from London to the Portsmouth area) and to Alton via the Meon valley – both closed.
 Swanwick
 Bursledon
 Hamble
 Netley Original terminus of the Southampton and Netley Railway, built to serve the Military Hospital, which had its own short railway and station. The line from here to St Denys was originally single track (later doubled)
 Sholing
 Woolston
 Bitterne on the outskirts of Southampton. There was a passing point when the line was single track.
With the junction at St Denys the West Coastway Line joins the route of the South West Main Line

References

External links
Southern Railway map, including the West Coastway Route
Brighton to Hove cab ride video produced by British Rail (on YouTube)

Rail transport in West Sussex
Rail transport in Hampshire
Transport in Brighton and Hove
Transport in Portsmouth
Railway lines in South East England
Standard gauge railways in England